The 2020 FIM Ice Speedway World Championship was the 55th edition of the FIM Individual Ice Racing World Championship season. The world champion was determined by ten races hosted in five cities Almata, Tolyatti, Shadrinsk, Inzell and Heerenveen between 1 February and 8 April 2020. However the fourth and fifth rounds were cancelled due to the COVID-19 pandemic and the standings after three rounds were declared the official results.

Daniil Ivanov won the reduced World Championship series to become world champion for the fourth time.

Final Series

Classification

See also 
2020 Ice Speedway of Nations

References 

Ice speedway competitions
World